Mujahid Ahmed Bello (born 16 August 1988) known by his stage name Fancy Gadam, is a Ghanaian afropop, dancehall and reggae musical artist. In 2017 he won Ghana Music Awards for Best New Artist and in 2020 was named Best Afrobeat Entertainer at the International Reggae and World Music Awards.

Early life and music career
Fancy Gadam was born in Hausa Zongo, a suburb of Tamale, the capital town of the Northern Region (Ghana). He completed his basic education at the Police Barracks Basic School in Tamale. Fancy Gadam started his music career at the age of 12 as a performer at schools and public events.

Notable performances
On 1 December 2017, Fancy Gadam was one of the headline artists at the S Concert when he performed to the early hours of Saturday 2 December 2017.

His Dream Album launch and concert, on 5 October 2019 pulled over 20,000 fan to the Tamale stadium (Now Aliu Mahama stadium).

Fancy Gadam also performed  at the  Bukom boxing arena on 8 March 2020 as part of his Dream album tour.  He was said to have previously toured Yeji, Nyong, Offinso, Koforidua, Wa. Yendi, Kumbungu and Dallung

He participated in the 2017 and 2018 editions of Ghana meets Naija, An Annual musical concert organized in Ghana to promote unity among Ghanaian and Nigerian artists. The concert also seeks to provide an opportunity for music lovers to interact and take photographs with their favorite artists from both countries.

Fancy Gadam on Easter Monday 2020 was invited to perform at the Covid-19 Virtual Concert together with other top Ghanaian artists for the launch of the Ghana Covid-19 Tracker software. An initiative to help trace and track persons with coronavirus in Ghana.

Philanthropy
Fancy Gadam made a donation of assorted drinks, food and other items to the Yumbass special school, a special school for needy and less privileged in the northern region.

On 30 December 2017, Fancy Gadam and his management, 5 minutes records made a donation of rice and several assorted items to the national chief imam of Ghana, Osman Nuhu Sharubutu.

Endorsements
In 2016, Fancy Gadam signed a one-year deal with Twellium Company Limited, manufacturers of rush energy drink as the brand ambassador for the 3 northern regions of Ghana. He now joins other musicians like Rudebwoy Ranking, Shatta Wale and Kwadwo Nkansah as brand ambassadors for the fasting-growing energy drink in Ghana.

On 2 January 2018, He was endorsed by the Ministry of Inner City And Zongo Development And The Commission For National Culture as the new Face of Zongo community at the Zongofest 2017, an event that is hosted to honor individuals who have contributed to the development of the Zongo communities in Ghana.

Discography

Studio albums
 Lahzibsi
 Nyagsim
 Ashili
 Takahi
 Nawuni Yeko
 Mujahid (2018)
His 6th studio album "Dream" was released on 5 October 2019 with 13 tracks.

Notable collaborations 
 Total Cheat ft Sarkodie
 Best Friend ft Stonebwoy.
 My baby ft Mugeez (R2bees)
 Only You ft Kuami Eugene
 Langalanga ft Mr Eazi
 Hook Up Girl ft Kwesi Arthur, Kofi Mole, Colours Man
Juju ft Shatta Wale
Fara ft Kofi Kinaata
Customer ft Patoranking

Awards and nominations

Northern Entertainment Awards

|-
|2016
|Himself
|Overall Artiste of The Year
|
|-
|2016
|Himself
|Artiste Of The Year northern region
|
|-

Northern Music Awards (NMA)

|-
|2016
|Himself
|Artiste of the Year
|
|-
|2016
|Concrete
|Most popular of the Year
|
|-
|2016
|Ototi kurigu
|Songwriter of the Year
|
|-
|2016
|Fancy Gadam ft. Mokid – Gadam Nation
|Best collaboration of the Year
|
|-
|2016
|Concrete
|Best video of the Year
|
|-

Jigwe Awards

|-
|2016
|Himself
|Jigwe New Act (Discovery)
|
|-

Bass Awards

|-
|2016
|Himself
|Discovery Of The Year
|
|-
|2017
|Himself
|Performer of the Year
|

Vodafone Ghana Music Awards

|-
|2017
|Himself
|New Artist Of The Year
|
|-
|rowspan="2"|2018
|rowspan="2"|Himself
|Song of the Year-Total Cheat ft Sarkodie
|
|-
|Hiplife Artiste of the Year
|
|-

People's Celebrity Awards

|-
|2017
|Himself-Total cheat
|Favourite music video category
|
|-
|2017
|Himself-Total cheat
|Favourite Song category
|
|-

International Reggae & World Music Awards (IRAWMA)

|-
|2019
|Himself- 
|Best Afrobeat Entertainer
|
|-
|2020
|Himself- 
|Most Promising Entertainer
|
|-

Ghana Entertainment Awards (USA)

|-
|2019
|Himself- 
|Best Male Act
|
|-

Ghana-Naija Showbiz Awards

|-
|2019
|Himself- 
|Best Male Act
|
|-

All Africa Music Awards (AFRIMMA)

|-
|2018
|Himself- 
|Best African Group
|
|-

References

External links
 

1988 births
Living people
People from Northern Region (Ghana)
Ghanaian songwriters
21st-century Ghanaian musicians
Dagomba people